Old John Neptune (Penobscot, (July 22, 1767 – May 8, 1865) was elected Lieutenant-Governor at Indian Island, Old Town, Maine, in 1816, a life-time position. Born into the Eel clan, John had a powerful father, John (Orsong) Neptune, who had been the tribe's war chief. As the most powerful leader of the Penobscot for almost half a century, he was popularly (but incorrectly) known as "the Governor."  Also feared, he had the reputation of being a medicine man (m'teoulino, in the Penobscot language).

Shortly after Maine achieved statehood, the areas of the Penobscot and St. John rivers were mapped with important guidance from Penobscot Indian Lt. Gov. John Neptune. Maine State Archive.

In The Maine Woods (1864), writer Henry David Thoreau described an 1853 visit to Neptune at his Old Town home.

References

1767 births
1865 deaths
Native American leaders
Religious figures of the indigenous peoples of North America
Penobscot people
People from Penobscot Indian Island Reservation
Native American people from Maine
19th-century Native Americans